The 1947 Rhineland-Palatinate state election was conducted on 18 May 1947 to elect members to the Landtag, the state legislature of Rhineland-Palatinate, Allied-occupied Germany.

|-
|colspan=15| 
|-
! style="background-color:#E9E9E9;text-align:left;" width=325px colspan=2|Party
! style="background-color:#E9E9E9;text-align:right;" width=75px |Vote %
! style="background-color:#E9E9E9;text-align:right;" width=75px |Seats
|-
| width=5px style="background-color: " |
| style="text-align:left;" | Christian Democratic Union
| style="text-align:right;" | 47.2
| style="text-align:right;" | 48
|-
| style="background-color: " |
| style="text-align:left;" | Social Democratic Party
| style="text-align:right;" | 34.3
| style="text-align:right;" | 34
|-
| style="background-color: " |
| style="text-align:left;" | Free Democratic Party
| style="text-align:right;" | 9.8
| style="text-align:right;" | 11
|-
| style="background-color: " |
| style="text-align:left;" | Communist Party of Germany
| style="text-align:right;" | 8.7
| style="text-align:right;" | 8
|- style="background: #E9E9E9"
! style="text-align:left;" colspan=2| Total
| style="text-align:right;" |  100.0
| 101
|-
| colspan=5 style="text-align:left;" | Source: parties-and-elections.de
|}

1947
1947 elections in Germany